The Wonder Motor Car Company was a very short lived car company in 1909 that was derived from the Kansas City Motor Car Company as a last ditch effort to stay in business and continue car production. The Kansas City Motor Car Company which made cars and trucks from 1905 to 1909 was itself derived from the Caps Brothers Manufacturing Company that briefly made cars in 1905. No examples of any Caps Brothers,  Kansas City, or Wonder cars or trucks are known to exist today.

See also

References

Brass Era vehicles
Vehicle manufacturing companies established in 1909
Companies based in Kansas City, Missouri
Motor vehicle assembly plants in Missouri
1909 establishments in Missouri
Defunct manufacturing companies based in Missouri

Motor vehicle manufacturers based in Missouri